Frank v Canada (AG) 2019 SCC 1 is a case decided by the Supreme Court of Canada regarding the voting rights of expatriate Canadians.  The majority in the 5–2 decision struck down a passage in the Canada Elections Act which had limited the right to vote to "a person who has been absent from Canada for less than five consecutive years and who intends to return to Canada as a resident".

Background

Section 3 of the Canadian Charter of Rights and Freedoms (1982) states:

This is subject to Section 1, which states:

In May 1993, the government of Brian Mulroney amended the Canada Elections Act so that Canadians living abroad could vote in federal elections under the condition that they were:

Those who returned to visit Canada within the five-year limit had this time reset, so that those who frequently returned to visit Canada maintained the right to vote from abroad.  After Stephen Harper's government came to power in 2006, it began strictly enforcing the five-year limit, so that it never reset for those who visited Canada.

The provisions in the act were challenged by Canadian citizens Gillian Frank and Jamie Duong.  Both worked at universities in the United States, as they could not find suitable work in Canada.  When they found they could not vote in the 2011 Canadian federal election, they pursued a case.

The Justin Trudeau government introduced the Elections Modernization Act shortly before the Supreme Court's decision; the legislation restored expatriate voting rights, but left open whether future governments could take them away again.

References

Works cited

External links

 Frank v. Canada (Attorney General) at Lexum

2019 in Canadian case law
Canadian Charter of Rights and Freedoms case law
Supreme Court of Canada cases
Elections in Canada
Expatriate voting
Canadian diaspora